Tush (also known as The Bill Tush Show) is an American late-night television sketch comedy and variety show developed by Bill Tush and directed by 
R. T. Williams. The show premiered on Atlanta superstation WTBS in the United States.  A number of the stars, including Jan Hooks, Terry Turner, and Bonnie Turner went on to work for Saturday Night Live.  The regular cast was Larry Larson, Ron Kirk, Iris Little-Roberts (now Little-Thomas), Eddie Lee, Allison Biggers, Rob Cleveland, Bob Gillies, Ted Henning, Yetta Levitt.

Awards
• 1982 CableACE Award - ACE	Single Program - General Entertainment or Variety: Comedy

References

1980 American television series debuts
1981 American television series endings
1980s American sketch comedy television series
1980s American variety television series
English-language television shows
TBS (American TV channel) original programming
Television series by Studio T